Francisco Sierra (born 1977, Chile) is a contemporary artist known for his use of irony and humour in his photorealistic drawings and paintings.

Early life
Sierra was born in Chile in 1977 and moved with his family to Switzerland in 1986.

Awards
He has received several Swiss grants and the Manor Art Prize, for which he was given a solo exhibition at the Kunstmuseum St. Gallen.

Exhibitions
 Solo exhibition at Wilhelm-Hack-Museum 
 Solo exhibition at Galerie Gregor Staiger 
 solo exhibition at Kunstmuseum Solothurn

Monographs 

Francisco Sierra. With texts by Christoph Vögele, Raphael Gygax, Roland Wäspe and an interview by Nadine Wietlisbach, edited by Kunstmuseum St.Gallen and Kunstmuseum Solothurn. Verlag für Moderne Kunst Nürnberg, 2013 -  
Cahier d’Artiste. Text by Giovanni Carmine, edited by Pro Helvetia Schweizer Kulturstiftung, Edizioni Periferia, 2009  - 
A Parallel Universe. Text by Fanni Fetzer and Reinhard Spieler, edited by Kunsthaus Langenthal und Wilhelm-Hack-Museum, Ludwigshafen am Rhein, 2009  -

References

External links
 Official Website

1977 births
21st-century Swiss painters
21st-century Swiss male artists
Swiss male painters
Swiss contemporary artists
Living people
20th-century Swiss male artists